Princess Augusta Reuss, Junior Line (Auguste Mathilde Wilhelmine Reuß; 26 May 1822 – 3 March 1862) was Grand Duchess of Mecklenburg-Schwerin as the first spouse of Frederick Francis II, Grand Duke of Mecklenburg-Schwerin.

Early life
Princess Augusta, third child and second daughter of Prince Heinrich LXIII Reuss of Köstritz, and his first wife, Countess Eleonore of Stolberg-Wernigerode, was born at Klipphausen, Kingdom of Saxony.

Reuss zu Köstritz branch belonged to the Junior line of the House of Reuss.

Marriage
On 3 November 1849 in Ludwigslust, Augusta married Frederick Francis II, Grand Duke of Mecklenburg-Schwerin son of Paul Frederick, Grand Duke of Mecklenburg-Schwerin.  Together they had six children.

Frederick Francis III (1851–1897) father of Alexandrine, Queen of Denmark and Cecile, last Crown Princess of Prussia.
Paul Friedrich (1852–1923) married Princess Marie of Windisch-Grätz.
Marie (1854–1920) married Grand Duke Vladimir Alexandrovich of Russia. Their son Cyril became pretender to the Russian throne after the assassination of his cousin Nicholas II of Russia.
Nikolaus (1855–1856).
John Albert (1857–1920) Imperial regent of the Duchy of Brunswick; married firstly to Princess Elisabeth Sybille of Saxe-Weimar-Eisenach; second marriage to Princess Elisabeth of Stolberg-Rossla.
Duke Alexander (1859–1859).

Death

Augusta's early death raised some questions in the court. It was said that Augusta died of "bronchial problems associated with heart disease". One biographer said she died of a type of fever.

Augusta was buried in the gardens of Schwerin Castle and by 1905, a memorial portrait was built by sculptor Wilhelm Wandschneider.

Ancestry

References

|-

1822 births
1862 deaths
House of Mecklenburg-Schwerin
People from Meissen (district)
Grand Duchesses of Mecklenburg-Schwerin
Duchesses of Mecklenburg-Schwerin
Princesses of Reuss
Burials at Schwerin Cathedral